Christopher Columbus – The Enigma (Cristóvão Colombo - O Enigma) is a 2007 Portuguese film directed by Manoel de Oliveira. It was filmed in both Portugal and the United States. It was screened out of competition at the 64th edition of the Venice Film Festival.

Cast
 Ricardo Trêpa as Manuel Luciano (1946–60)  
 Leonor Baldaque as Sílvia (1957–60)  
 Manoel de Oliveira as Manuel Luciano (2007) 
 Maria Isabel de Oliveira as Sílvia (2007) 
 Jorge Trêpa as Hermínio 
 Lourença Baldaque as O Anjo   
 Leonor Silveira as Mãe  
 Luís Miguel Cintra as Director Museu Porto Santo

See also

Cinema of Portugal

References

External links
 

2007 drama films
2007 films
Films directed by Manoel de Oliveira
Portuguese drama films